Baddo, also spelt Bado, is a village in the Punjab province of Pakistan.

Villages in Mandi Bahauddin District